Gorzyce  (Horytsi) is a village in the administrative district of Gmina Tryńcza, within Przeworsk County, Subcarpathian Voivodeship, in south-eastern Poland.

The village has a population of 1,282.

References

Villages in Przeworsk County